Warm Springs is a census-designated place (CDP) and an unincorporated community in Jefferson County, Oregon, United States. Located on the Warm Springs Indian Reservation, the community is also known as the "Warm Springs Agency". The population was 2,945 at the 2010 census, up from 2,431 at the 2000 census.

Geography

Warm Springs is located in northern Jefferson County at  (44.760168, -121.268233). The Deschutes River forms the eastern boundary of the CDP.

U.S. Route 26 passes through the center of the community, leading southeast  to Madras and northwest  to Portland.

Climate
This region experiences warm, (but not hot), and dry summers, with no average monthly temperatures above .  According to the Köppen Climate Classification system, Warm Springs has a warm-summer Mediterranean climate, abbreviated "Csb" on climate maps.

Demographics
As of the census of 2000, there were 2,431 people, 603 households, and 507 families residing in the CDP. The population density was 57.2 people per square mile (22.1/km2). There were 642 housing units at an average density of 15.1 per square mile (5.8/km2). The racial makeup of the CDP was 2.47% White, 0.08% African American, 93.46% Native American, 0.08% Pacific Islander, 1.11% from other races, and 2.80% from two or more races. Hispanic or Latino of any race were 6.50% of the population.

There were 603 households, out of which 50.9% had children under the age of 18 living with them, 35.3% were married couples living together, 34.2% had a female householder with no husband present, and 15.9% were non-families. 11.4% of all households were made up of individuals, and 2.7% had someone living alone who was 65 years of age or older. The average household size was 4.02 and the average family size was 4.19.

In the CDP, the population was spread out, with 41.1% under the age of 18, 10.7% from 18 to 24, 28.4% from 25 to 44, 15.4% from 45 to 64, and 4.4% who were 65 years of age or older. The median age was 24 years. For every 100 females, there were 104.8 males. For every 100 females age 18 and over, there were 101.5 males.

The median income for a household in the CDP was $29,886, and the median income for a family was $28,300. Males had a median income of $27,083 versus $20,897 for females. The per capita income for the CDP was $8,583. About 28.2% of families and 32.3% of the population were below the poverty line, including 37.9% of those under age 18 and 15.9% of those age 65 or over.

See also
 The Museum at Warm Springs

References

Census-designated places in Oregon
Unincorporated communities in Jefferson County, Oregon
Census-designated places in Jefferson County, Oregon
Unincorporated communities in Oregon
Seats of government of American Indian reservations